André Coimbra is a Portuguese former professional Magic: The Gathering player and former professional poker player, member of PokerStars Team Online, he retired in 2017 after choosing not to renew his contract. He is from Coimbra, Portugal, and is perhaps best known in the Magic: The Gathering community for winning the Magic: The Gathering 2009 World Championship.

Career

Magic: The Gathering Accomplishments

Decks
Much of the talk after the 2009 World Championship centred on André Coimbra's deck.  The deck was designed by professional Magic: The Gathering writer Mike Flores, who called the deck 'Naya Lightsaber'.  The deck was designed to beat Jund, the dominant deck at the time, and did just that when Coimbra won the World Championships finals 3–0 against David Reitbauer's Jund deck.

References

Living people
Magic: The Gathering players
People from Coimbra
1986 births
Players who have won the Magic: The Gathering World Championship